Exercise Campaign Reforger ("REturn of FORces to GERmany") was an annual military exercise and campaign conducted by NATO during the Cold War. The exercise was intended to ensure that NATO had the ability to quickly deploy forces to West Germany in the event of a conflict with the Warsaw Pact. Although most troops deployed were from the United States, the operation also involved a substantial number of troops from other NATO countries including Canada and the United Kingdom.

The last Reforger exercise was Reforger 93. Exercise Bright Star, a similar biannual military exercise in Egypt, serves essentially the same purpose in the 21st century.

History

The Reforger exercise itself was first conceived in 1967. During the ongoing Vietnam War, U.S. President Lyndon Johnson announced plans to withdraw approximately two divisions from Europe in 1968. As a demonstration of its continuing commitment to the defense of NATO and to illustrate its capability of rapid reinforcement, a large scale force deployment was planned that would deploy a division or more to West Germany in a regular annual exercise. The first such exercise was conducted beginning on 6 January 1969.

These exercises continued annually past the end of the Cold War, except for the year 1989, until 1993. Reforger 75 marked the operational presence of the U.S. Marine Corps in Europe for the first time since World War I, when the 2nd Marine Division's 32nd Marine Amphibious Unit was deployed from Camp Lejeune, North Carolina as part of that exercise. Reforger 88, involving around 125,000 troops, was billed as the largest European ground maneuver since World War II.

Reforger was not merely a show of force—in the event of a conflict, it would be the actual plan to strengthen the NATO presence in Europe. In that instance, it would have been referred to as Operation Reforger. Important components in Reforger included the Military Airlift Command, the Military Sealift Command, and the Civil Reserve Air Fleet.

The U.S. Army also increased its rapid-reinforcement capability by prepositioning huge stocks of equipment and supplies in Europe at POMCUS sites. The maintenance of this equipment has provided extensive on-the-job training to reserve-component support units.

The last Reforger exercise was Reforger 93. No further Reforger exercises were held after due to German reunification, the dissolution of the Soviet Union and the Warsaw Pact, and the end of the Cold War.

Reforger units

The following units were earmarked to return to West Germany in case of war:

 III US Corps, Fort Hood, TX
 1st Cavalry Division, Ft. Hood, TX, POMCUS Set at 5 depots in Belgium (Grobbendonk, Zutendaal) and the Netherlands (Brunssum, Eygelshoven) and ammunition depot in Zutendaal in Belgium.
 2nd Armored Division, Ft. Hood, TX, POMCUS Set at 4 depots in the Federal Republic of Germany (Mönchengladbach, Straelen, Osterholz-Scharmbeck) and ammunition depot in Kevelaer.
 5th Infantry Division (Mechanized), Fort Polk, LA, POMCUS Set at 6 depots in the Netherlands (Ter Apel, Coevorden, Vriezenveen) and ammunition depot in Coevorden.
 212th Field Artillery Brigade, Fort Sill, OK, POMCUS Set at 4 depots in the Federal Republic of Germany (Mönchengladbach) and ammunition depot in Kevelaer.
 3rd Armored Cavalry Regiment, Fort Bliss, TX, POMCUS Set at 4 depots in the Federal Republic of Germany (Mönchengladbach) and ammunition depot in Kevelaer
 V Corps, Frankfurt, FRG
 4th Infantry Division (Mechanized), Fort Carson, CO, POMCUS Set at 2 depots at Kaiserslautern.
 194th Armored Brigade, Fort Knox, KY, POMCUS Set at 3 depots in the Federal Republic of Germany at Pirmasens
 197th Infantry Brigade (Mechanized), Fort Benning, GA, POMCUS Set at 3 depots in the Federal Republic of Germany at Pirmasens
 VII Corps, Stuttgart, FRG
 1st Infantry Division (Mechanized), Fort Riley, KS, POMCUS Set at 1 depot at Mannheim.
 1st Canadian Division (Mechanized Infantry), CFB Kingston, ON, Canadian Forces War Stocks at CFB Baden–Soellingen and CFB Lahr.

228th AHB (Attack Helicopter Bn.) 1st/227th.

Reforger exercises

References

Newcomb's military service records and Newcomb's "History Book"

External links

 REFORGER, GlobalSecurity.org

Military exercises involving the United States
NATO military exercises